Melaleuca venusta is a shrub in the myrtle family Myrtaceae and is endemic to the west coast of Western Australia. It is a shrub with silvery leaves and heads of pink to purple flowers which fade to white and with a restricted distribution, north of the Murchison River district.

Description
Both surfaces of the leaves are densely covered with silky hairs giving the foliage a silvery grey colour.

The stamens are grouped in five bundles around the flower, each bundle consisting of 7 to 11 stamens. The stamens give the flowers a pinkish mauve to purple colour which fades rapidly to white. The flowers appear mainly in October and November and are followed by fruit which are woody capsules  in spherical clusters.

Taxonomy and naming
Melaleuca venusta was first formally described in 1999 by Lyndley Craven in Australian Systematic Botany. The specific epithet (venusta) is from the Latin venustus meaning "like Venus", "lovely", "beautiful", "elegant" or "graceful".

Distribution and habitat
Melaleuca venusta only occurs in the Kalbarri district in the Geraldton Sandplains biogeographic zone north of the Murchison River. It grows in sand over limestone.

Conservation
Melaleuca venusta is classified as "not threatened" by the Government of Western Australia Department of Parks and Wildlife.

Use in horticulture
The species is not known in cultivation but its mauve flowers contrasting with its attractive silvery foliage suggest it "merits trial as an ornamental shrub in dry Mediterranean climates".

References

venusta
Plants described in 1999
Endemic flora of Western Australia
Taxa named by Lyndley Craven